Óscar Vicente Martins Duarte (born 5 December 1950 in Praia), known simply as Óscar,  is a former Portuguese  footballer who played as midfielder.

He earned his only cap for the Portugal national football team on 8 March 1978, playing the last 12 minutes of a 2–0 friendly defeat to France at the Parc des Princes in place of fellow debutant José Alberto Costa.

External links 
 
 
 Oscar Duarte Interview

1950 births
Living people
Sportspeople from Praia
Portuguese footballers
Portugal international footballers
Cape Verdean footballers
Portuguese sportspeople of Cape Verdean descent
Association football midfielders
Primeira Liga players
G.D. Estoril Praia players
FC Porto players
Boavista F.C. players
Associação Académica de Coimbra – O.A.F. players
S.C. Farense players